"Eternal Blaze" is the 12th single by J-Pop singer Nana Mizuki, released on October 19, 2005 by King Records. It was composed by Noriyasu Agematsu and written by Nana Mizuki. It is considered Mizuki's breakthrough hit single. The song spent two weeks in the top twenty of the Japanese Oricon charts, peaking at number 2.

"Eternal Blaze" was used as opening theme for the anime series Magical Girl Lyrical Nanoha A's, and it was the first single by a voice actress to reach number 2 on the weekly chart.

Track listing
Eternal Blaze
Lyrics: Nana Mizuki
Composition, arrangement: Noriyasu Agematsu (Elements Garden)
Opening theme for anime television Magical Girl Lyrical Nanoha A's
Rush & Dash!
Lyrics: Bee
Composition, arrangement: Hitoshi Fujima (Elements Garden)
Inside of mind
Lyrics: Ryōji Sonoda
Composition, arrangement: Wataru Masachi

Charts

References

Nana Mizuki songs
2005 singles
Songs written by Nana Mizuki
2005 songs
King Records (Japan) singles
Songs with music by Noriyasu Agematsu